United for Hungary is a political alliance in Hungary that was formed to compete in the 2022 parliamentary election.

History

The need for collaboration

The need for opposition cooperation stems from the characteristics of the latest electoral system, the diversity of opposition parties, and the game-theoretic characteristics of human behavior:

 a single round, plurality voting system introduced in 2011 delegates the most supported district candidate to parliament, even if his or her support is actually below 50%, only the other candidates received even less support individually. This is identical in the United Kingdom, however in Hungary, the electoral system was adopted and therefore districts were created solely by the ruling parties, and many consider the districts to be gerrymandered in their favour.
 due to the unity of the right-wing ruling parties (Fidesz–KDNP) and the multiplicity of opposition parties, and without opposition coordination, the last voters have been naturally divided among their parties for years, so that their voting power has mostly not reached the one-sided right-wing community
 opposition parties face the tragedy of the commons known from game theory, because if they pursue their selfish interests alone, they are more likely to get into parliament and stay afloat, although they cannot form a government, and their cooperation is hampered by the fact that "a selfish player in this game his behavior naturally entails similar behavior by others":
 "Under the current rules, if a single party lists, it must reach 5% to get in, if two, 10%, if more, 15%." – it encourages selfishness, as there is a greater risk to not reaching the higher threshold
 "a political group could henceforth be formed only by members of the same party who had drawn up a national list and obtained a mandate in the previous election" – this is a condition for remaining afloat
 out of 106 "candidates must be nominated in 27 SMDs (since increase to 71) in order for the nominating organization to have a national list" – but the district votes are shattered if more opposition candidates enter in one district
vote for losing candidates are transferred to the list tier (although with inherently less weight), thereby encouraging every party to run a candidate in every SMD if they run separately, unless any agreements to tactically withdraw prove more beneficial

According to Tibor Závecz, managing director of Závecz Research, the support data and the willingness of the opposition side to vote show that there can even be close competition between Fidesz and the opposition, which has been cooperating much more closely than before. Fidesz has a huge advantage on the party list, but it can be a potential challenger in the unifying opposition. According to a July 2020 poll, 87% of opposition voters supported the common candidate, 83% also supported the common list.

Foundation and Purpose of the Alliance
The founder parties of the alliance at its formation were the Hungarian Socialist Party, Democratic Coalition, Movement for a Better Hungary (Jobbik), LMP – Hungary's Green Party, Dialogue for Hungary and the Momentum Movement.

The alliance's aim is to nominate one candidate against the Fidesz–KDNP candidate in each of the 106 individual constituencies and, in the event of a victory, to co-govern on the basis of a commonly agreed programme and principles.

Opposition parties are not expected to merge completely, as the goal is not to eliminate differences, but to function if they want not only a change of government, but "to create a lasting livable Hungary where differences can be discussed and managed".

Controversies within the party alliance
Closer cooperation through the alliance, but much debate is also expected between the parties. A joint program can be created through close cooperation between the expert staffs, the background institutions and the party foundations operating them, which requires the coordination of financial resources and communication activities.

Serious debates were expected on the selection of the 106 individual candidates, the issue of joint or separate lists, and the manner in which the joint prime ministerial candidate would be selected. The alliance was born of several ideas; some parties supported full cooperation, but Péter Jakab, president of Jobbik, spoke of two types of lists, namely an MSZP-DK-Dialogue and a Jobbik-Momentum-LMP list. Jakab said he needed two lists because he said not many people in rural villages would vote for politicians ruling before 2010. A joint decision on this issue is expected by the end of 2020. According to a July 2020 survey, only 5 percent wanted more lists, the rest uncertain. Common candidates were supported regardless of party preference, with differences in sympathizers from each party in the common list: 80 and 81 percent of DK and Momentum voters would support "only" it (4 and 7 percent, respectively, strongly oppose it), while 88-91 percent of the rate. In his view, that one list would be psychologically better for the opposition. However, according to an analyst at Political Capital, anti-Orbán voters could be better mobilized if they had at least one tiny choice and could choose at least the most attractive party groupings.

Primary elections

The party presidents agreed to set up a joint programme in the interests of the country and considered the institution of primary elections to be a legitimate tool for the selection of individual candidates in addition to the negotiated path. Not only individual joint candidates were decided by primary, but also the person of the joint prime ministerial candidate.

The opposition primary was held between 18 and 28 September 2021 (first round) and 10–16 October 2021 (second round), it was the first countrywide primary election in the political history of Hungary. 106 local candidates were elected to be the joint candidates of the participating opposition parties.

Non-partisan candidate Péter Márki-Zay was elected as prime ministerial candidate of the united opposition.

Selection of list candidates
The full list of candidates that will make up the joint list of United for Hungary are yet to be announced. Some participating parties, including MSZP, LMP, Momentum and Dialogue for Hungary have already put forward a list of their preferred candidates for the joint list.

Composition
United for Hungary is composed of the following political parties and organisations:

Main parties

Associate parties

Organizations

Election results

National Assembly

Notes

References

2020 establishments in Hungary
Opposition to Viktor Orbán
Political opposition organizations
Political parties established in 2020
Political party alliances in Hungary